Peter Mumford may refer to:
 Peter Mumford (bishop)
 Peter Mumford (lighting designer)